The results of the 2014 5th Tarang Cine Awards, the awards presented annually by the Tarang entertainment television channel to honor artistic and technical excellence in the Oriya language film industry of India ("Ollywood"), are as follow:
 Category      ...Winner ... Film
 Best Dialogues ...Bijay Malla ...Hata Dhari Chalutha
 Best Lyrics ... Arun Mantri 
 Best Music Director ...Mihir Mohanty ...Rumku Jhumana 
 Best Singer (Male)... Babushan ... Daha Balunga 
 Best Singer (Female)  ... Trupti Das 
 Best Actor Negative Role (Male)  ...Pritiraj ...ACP Sagarika 
 Best Actress Negative Role (Female) ... Snigdha Mohanty ...Tu Mo Suna Tu Mo Heera 
 Best Actor in Comic Role ...Pintu Nanda ...Deewana Deewani
 Best Debutant Actor (Male) ...Amlan Dash ... Target 
 Debutant Actor (Female) ...Sambhabana Mohanty ... Mu Raja Tu Rani 
 Best Child Actor  ... Bhumika Dash ... Rumku Jhumana 
 Best Supporting Actor (Male) ... Minaketan Das ... Diwana Diwani 
 Best Supporting Actor (Female) ... Sadhana Parija ... Rumku Jhumana 
 Best Director ...Susant Mani ... Mu Eka Tumara 
 Best Film ...Hata Dhari Chalutha
 Best Actor (Male) ...Anubhav Mohanty ... Hata Dhari Chalutha
 Best Actor (Female) ...Archita Sahu...

References

Tarang Cine Awards
2014 Indian film awards